The Nationalist can refer to several publications:

 The Nationalist (1889) (1889-1891), the official magazine of the Nationalist Clubs published in Boston
 The Nationalist (Carlow), a newspaper in Ireland
 The Nationalist (Tipperary), a newspaper in Ireland
 The Nationalist (United States), formerly a Socialist magazine established in Boston
 The Nationalist (Mobile, Alabama), a former post-American Civil War era newspaper for African Americans